John "Elias" Villagran (born March 1, 1994), known professionally as Lil Lotus (stylized as LiL Lotus) is an American musician, singer and rapper from Dallas, Texas. He has released one solo studio album, four solo EPs, three collaborative EPs and an additional two EPs as a part of the alternative hip hop group Boyfriendz and three EPs as a member of the post-hardcore band If I Die First.

Beginning his career playing in multiple local Texas metalcore bands, he began an acoustic solo career in 2016 under the name Tremor. After posting a number of songs on SoundCloud he became increasingly influenced by the emerging emo rap scene on the platform, which led to him taking on the Lil Lotus moniker and associating with members and affiliates of GothBoiClique.

Early life
John "Elias" Villagran grew up in Pleasant Grove, Dallas, Texas with devout Christian parents. In childhood, he and his family attended Fellowship Church. His father was a musician, who introduced to a wide variety of musical styles including jazz, reggaeton and oldies. He became influenced to make music through groups like Linkin Park and Paramore, as well as various emo and heavy metal songs that his friend had put on an iPod that Villagran had stolen. He was eventually accepted into a music and arts high school and began being taught guitar by his father. By fourteen, he and his brother were performing praise and worship music at their church, which led to him forming a Christian melodic hardcore band. His first concert was at the Palladium Ballroom at fourteen, watching Paramore, the Starting Line and the Almost. He found himself doing fill-in spots for various acts in his local metalcore scene, including Be//Gotten and Azera, as well as becoming a frequent user of drugs such as LSD and Xanax. When Villagran was eighteen, his father died, which led him to leave home and live in his car for the following two years. He spent much of this period parked in friends' driveways and talking to his mother once a month by phone call. After returning home, he commenced his fill-in roles, organising local concerts and working day jobs in factories. The birth of his son Luca led him to stop performing with bands and begin pursuing music solo.

Career

Solo
Villagran began recording and mixing acoustic solo music and uploading the songs online in 2016. At this time he was performing under the name Tremor. He soon changed his stage name to Lil Lotus, after being introduced to and becoming influenced by the sound of GothBoiClique members Wicca Phase Springs Eternal, Horse Head and Coldhart. His career began to grow as he began having tracks of his such as "Run Home" and "Scared to Die" be uploaded on YouTube channels like Astari. In  June 15, 2017, he released the EP Bodybag. On September 14, 2017, he released the song "Ur Dad Has A Gun" featuring Shinigami. A music video was released for the track "Bodybag", which features Coldhart was released on January 15, 2018. From March 3 to April 6, he opened for Nothing,Nowhere on his U.S. headline tour alongside Shinigami and Jay-Vee. Between May 13 and 31, he opened for Senses Fail on their U.S. headline tour alongside Sharptooth. On August 10, he released a collaborative EP with Horse Head titled "I Did This to Myself". He was featured on the song "Don't Take Me For Pomegranate" by I Set My Friends on Fire released on September 7. From October 5 to October 9, he opened for Papa Roach on their short U.S. tour, alongside Of Mice & Men. On May 31, 2019, he released a collaborative EP with I Set My Friends on Fire, featuring one track where Villagran covers I Set My Friends on Fire, one track where I Set My Friends on Fire cover Villagran and two original collaborative songs. On December 11, it was announced that he had signed to Epitaph Records, which coincided with the release of the single "Never Get Away".

On February 3, 2020, he was featured on the single "Promise" by Tisoki. On February 21, he released the song "I Don’t Even Like U", as a single. On April 6, he released the song "Never Felt Better" as a single. On May 15, he released the EP All My Little Scars, Vol. 1, the first in a trilogy of EPs released in 2020. He featured on the song "Dead Roses" by Slit, which was released on July 31. On August 3, he released the EP All My Little Scars Vol. 2. On August 31, he released the final EP in the All My Little Scars trilogy. He was featured on the song "So In Love" by Danny Goo, which was released Sep 4, 2020. On February 16, 2021, he released the single "Girl Next Door" featuring Lil Aaron. On May 25, he released the single "Romantic Disaster" featuring Chrissy Costanza, and announced the release of his debut album Errør Bøy. On June 29, he released the single "Think of Me Tonight". On August 1, he released the single "Rooftop". Errør Bøy was officially released on August 20, 2021.

Boyfriendz
In late 2017, Villagran formed the group Boyfriendz, with Smrtdeath and Lil Aaron. They released their debut self-titled EP in December 2017. The EP was recorded in a single night and was released within a week through SoundCloud.

On February 14, 2018 Boyfriendz released their second EP BFZ2.

If I Die First
In 2020, he formed the band If I Die First. Villagran is the band's lead vocalist, accompanied by emo rappers Lil Zubin (clean vocals and keyboard) and Nedarb Nagrom (guitar and clean vocals), From First to Last guitarist Travis Richter (guitar and unclean vocals) and Ghostemane backing band musicians Cayle Sain (drums) and Nolan Nunes (bass). Their music has been categorised as metalcore, post-hardcore and screamo.

The members of the band met through both SoundCloud and frequenting Richter's music venue in Los Angeles. The band was formed in April 2020 with Villagran on vocals, Zubin on vocals, Nagrom on guitar and vocals, Sain on drums and Nunes on bass, with Richter joining and Zubin beginning to play keyboard by the end of the month. They took their name from Philadelphia rapper Chynna Rogers' EP In Case I Die First. Rogers was a friend of Nagrom's, who died in April 2020. On July 8 they released a music video for their debut single "Where Needles And Lovers Collide", directed by Max Beck and Ritcher, and announced the release of their debut EP My Poison Arms. On July 10, they released the EP, which consisted of six tracks. It was recorded by each member individually during the COVID-19 pandemic.

On March 30, 2021 the band announced a split EP with SeeYouSpaceCowboy called A Sure Disaster, which will be released on May 14, 2021 through Pure Noise Records. They also released a video for the collaborative single from the EP called bloodstainedeyes.

Personal life
Villagran has one child, his son named Luca. Luca was born when Villagran was twenty-one, to a woman named Miranda that he had been in a relationship with since he was nineteen. The couple broke up and got back together multiple times, but eventually broke up permanently after two years, a year of which was the relationship was long-distance, as she had moved to Oklahoma. Villagran has been in a relation with rapper Sage Aquafina, who he had become engaged to, and bought a house in Dallas with, by 2019. By 2020, the couple had split up, an event which influenced multiple of his subsequent songs.

Later on in Lil Lotus' career, he became addicted to cocaine and various opiates (mainly oxycodone and fentanyl). Eventually he reached sobriety, which he has maintained since the summer of 2019. After almost a year of sobriety, he relapsed for three months, before becoming sober once again in April 2020.

Villagran has been diagnosed with bipolar disorder. He is also openly bisexual.

Musical style
Villagran's early solo music has been categorised by critics as emo rap, with Hysteria magazine hailing him as "one of the biggest influences of the emo-rap genre". However, he disavows the label himself, preferring to say that his music is simply an updated version of emo. His music often incorporates elements of Contemporary R&B, trap and pop punk. Dead Press writer Tyler Turner described his music as "push[ing] the boundaries of modern emo without falling too deeply into the trap of instrumental idleness".

On his debut album Errør Bøy, Villagran transitioned his music closer to pop punk.

He has cited influences including the Red Jumpsuit Apparatus, Saosin, Alesana, Escape the Fate, SeeYouSpaceCowboy, Wicca Phase Springs Eternal, Horse Head and Cold Hart.

Discography

Studio albums

Extended plays

Singles

As lead artist

As featured artist

Collaborative

With Boyfriendz

With If I Die First

References

21st-century American singers
21st-century American male singers
American hip hop musicians
American male rappers
Emo rap musicians
Bisexual musicians
Musicians from Dallas
1994 births
Living people
20th-century LGBT people
21st-century LGBT people
LGBT people from Texas